In the 1997–98 football season, Newcastle United played in the FA Premier League. They finished 13th and reached the FA Cup final, losing to Arsenal.

Season summary
During the summer, David Ginola and Les Ferdinand were sold to Tottenham Hotspur, while in a pre-season friendly match, Alan Shearer sustained a horrific ankle injury which would keep him out for half the season. Manager Kenny Dalglish signed goalkeeper Shay Given, midfielder Temur Ketsbaia, striker John Barnes and veteran striker Ian Rush, the club's eldest player signing at age 36.

The highlight of the 1997–98 season was to be the club's run in the UEFA Champions League, seeing them defeat Barcelona 3–2 after a hat-trick from striker Faustino Asprilla. The club's Premier League form, however, began to suffer following Asprilla's departure from the club in January, and despite the return of Shearer to the starting line-up, he was unable to recapture the form he had found under Kevin Keegan. The club reached the FA Cup final only to fall to a 2–0 defeat by Arsenal.

Controversy surrounded the club in March 1998 when chairman Freddie Shepherd, and deputy chairman Douglas Hall (son of previous chairman Sir John Hall, who had retired during the summer), were filmed in a Spanish brothel making a series of remarks to an undercover tabloid journalist. They ridiculed Shearer, boasted of "ripping off" supporters with the club shirts they sold, and called the women of Newcastle "dogs". Both subsequently resigned, and Sir John Hall returned as acting chairman for the remainder of the season.

Newcastle enjoyed a good run in the 1997–98 FA Cup and reached the final for the first time in 24 years. They never looked like winners, and the final whistle blew with a 2–0 scoreline giving the trophy to opponents Arsenal. But as Arsenal had completed the double, Newcastle entered the 1998–99 Cup Winners' Cup.

Dalglish's cautious brand of football proved unpopular with supporters used to Newcastle's previous swashbuckling style; more importantly this cautious style was not producing results. Many players signed by Dalglish were not considered to match the quality of those who had left the club this season. The team's 13th-place finish gave particular cause for concern, as Newcastle had finished runners-up in the last two seasons and had never finished below sixth since returning to the top flight in 1993. To add insult to injury, only 35 league goals were scored by the club all season.

Despite signing Dietmar Hamann, Nolberto Solano and Gary Speed, several unsuccessful transfer deals along with a poor start to the 1998–99 season led to Dalglish being sacked.

Transfers

In

 Total spending:  £17,450,000

Out

 Total income:  £21,150,000

Coaching staff

Players

First-team squad
Squad at end of season

Left club during season

Reserve squad
The following players did not appear for the first-team this season.

Statistics

Appearances, goals and cards
(Substitute appearances in brackets)

Matches

Pre-season

Premier League

Champions League

FA Cup

League Cup

Notes

References

External links

FootballSquads - Newcastle United - 1997–98
Newcastle United Football Club - Fixtures 1997–98
Soccerbase - Newcastle United player appearances 1997–98
Season Details - 1997–98 - toon1892

1997-98
Newcastle United